Kenneth L. Marcus is an American attorney, academic, and government official. He is the founder and leader of the Brandeis Center. He was the Assistant Secretary for Civil Rights at the United States Department of Education from August 6, 2018 through July 9, 2020, after which he resumed his position at the Brandeis Center.

Marcus previously served as the Lillie and Nathan Ackerman Chair in Equality and Justice in America at Baruch College in New York. He also previously served as staff director of the United States Commission on Civil Rights (OCR).

Education 
Kenneth L. Marcus received a Bachelor of Arts, magna cum laude, from Williams College in June 1988. He was elected a member of Phi Beta Kappa in June 1987. He received a Juris Doctor from University of California, Berkeley, School of Law, Boalt Hall in 1991.

Career

Berkeley Three case 

Early in his career, Marcus served as lead counsel for the Berkeley Three, three neighbors in Berkeley, California who had protested against a planned low-income housing project for the homeless in their neighborhood in 1993 by the U.S. Department of Housing and Urban Development (HUD). A housing rights group complained about the protests and four federal HUD officials began investigating the neighbors. The neighbors, represented by Marcus and the Center for Individual Rights, sued the officials alleging that the investigation had violated their First Amendment rights. In 1998, a federal district court ruled in favor of the neighbors and the verdict was upheld by the U.S. Court of Appeals for the Ninth Circuit in 2000 which, in a unanimous opinion, held that the investigating officials "could not have reasonably believed their actions to be consistent with the First Amendment." Publicity regarding the case forced HUD to change its policy on fair housing investigations.

Fair Housing Enforcement 
Marcus served in various roles in the George W. Bush administration, beginning as General Deputy Assistant Secretary at the Office of Fair Housing and Equal Opportunity. Marcus also joined with Department of Justice officials to announce the resolution of various high-profile disabilities lawsuits. In a congressional hearing in 2002, he testified about the agency's performance under his stewardship. He said the agency's aged-case backlog had reduced from 80 percent to 37.1 percent and that HUD increased the number of accessible housing units for a person with a disability by over 1200 through major cases in the District of Columbia and Boston. He also announced new initiatives to address predatory lending and lending discrimination, as well as enhanced attention to housing problems faced by persons in the Southwest border area.

Office for Civil Rights 
Marcus served as Staff Director of the U.S. Commission on Civil Rights from 2004 to 2008. 

In May 2004, Marcus issued a letter admonishing recipients of federal education funds that in order to comply with Title IX they must designate a Title IX coordinator because OCR had found that some institutions were not complying with the requirement. Members of the National Coalition for Women and Girls in Education had urged OCR to issue such guidance to strengthen Title IX. The Feminist Majority Foundation welcomed the letter.

Marcus joined with then-Assistant Attorney General for Civil Rights Rene Alexander Acosta to issue guidance warning school districts to cease racially segregated activities. Their joint letter warned that practices such as holding segregated high school proms or naming separate race-based sets of recipients for senior-year honors (such as homecoming queen) "are inconsistent with federal law and should not be tolerated."

In an official letter, Marcus also clarified that OCR would interpret Title VI and Title IX as if they protected the rights of ethnic groups that shared a religious faith, to the same extent as if they did not share a common faith. This policy has been applied to Jewish, Muslim, and Sikh students.

In October 2004, Marcus issued a notice amending the regulations implementing Title IX of the Education Amendments of 1972. The purpose of the notice was to facilitate for school districts to offer single-sex public elementary and secondary education.

James S. Murphy, in The Atlantic wrote about Marcus's service at OCR: "With Marcus, the administration started taking a stronger approach to enforcing civil-rights laws. During his term, he issued guidance reminding schools of the need to have a Title IX officer and clarifying that Title VI also protected students of faith from discrimination." Marcus' work spearheaded OCR's efforts to better enforce and protect civil-right laws in America. Marcus was credited by The Wall Street Journal with having taken "an agency in disarray" that lacked "basic management controls," and turned it into an agency that "deserves a medal for good governance."

Academic career 
After he left government, Marcus served as the Lillie and Nathan Ackerman Visiting Professor of Equality and Justice in America at the City University of New York Baruch College School of Public Affairs. He taught courses on Diversity Management, Anti-Semitism and Civil Rights Law, and Law for the Education Administrator. He also oversaw the Ackerman Lecture Series, which invites intellectuals and public figures to spur debate and new thinking on equality and social justice.

While serving on the CUNY faculty, Marcus also directed an anti-Semitism program at the Institute for Jewish and Community Research.

Israel advocacy 
Later in 2011, Marcus founded the Louis D. Brandeis Center for Human Rights Under Law to "advance the civil and human rights of the Jewish people and promote justice for all." 

In 2012, he was featured on The Forward's "Forward 50" list of 50 American Jews who made a significant impact on the Jewish story in the past year. The magazine characterized him as "a former staff director at the U.S. Department of Education, Marcus, 46, has emerged as a vocal proponent of using federal civil rights law to combat perceived campus anti-Semitism in the context of the Israel debate" and mentioned his use of Title VI of the Civil Rights Act of 1964 to counter campus anti-Semitism.

Marcus opposes the BDS movement that calls for comprehensive boycotts against Israel, similar to those imposed on South Africa during the Apartheid era. He believes that BDS is an attempt to "resist the normalization of the Jewish people." However, determining whether BDS is anti-Semitic is a difficult question to answer, according to Marcus. He has therefore developed a list of criteria to determine when, in his opinion, BDS becomes anti-Semitic. The list includes examples such as unconscious hostility towards Jews, and the transmission of negatively coded cultural myths.

Education lawsuits 
Marcus has helped file or otherwise support Title VI complaints filed with the OCR, all related to the Israeli-Palestinian conflict. Six separate complaints have been filed against UC Irvine, UC Santa Cruz, UC Berkeley, Rutgers University, Barnard College, and Brooklyn College. These complaints alleged that certain activities by pro-Palestinian activist campus groups constituted violations of Title VI anti-discrimination provisions through "harassment" or "intimidation" that "targets" and creates a "hostile educational environment" for Jewish students.

In the first complaint Marcus filed in 2011, he claimed the chair of the Asian and Middle Eastern Cultures department at Barnard College had "steered" a Jewish student away from taking a class with Joseph Massad, a Palestinian professor and outspoken critic of Israel. He claimed Massad had created a hostile environment for Jewish students.

University President Lee Bollinger defended Massad and said it was "extremely unfair" he was named in the complaint since he played no part in the alleged "steering." The complaint was dismissed by the OCR for lack of evidence and also noted the student was not even eligible to take Massad's class.

OCR dismissed four more of Marcus' complaints "with written determination letters stating that the First Amendment protects speech critical of the state of Israel and that such speech does not constitute a civil rights violation." A fifth case was dismissed due to insufficient evidence and a sixth was settled before it was investigated.

Assistant Secretary of Education for Civil Rights 
In October 2017, Trump nominated Marcus to Assistant Secretary of Education for Civil Rights to head OCR. The nomination was confirmed by the US Senate in June 2018. Marcus was endorsed by a variety of groups, including B'nai B'rith and The American Jewish Committee, and opposed by groups including The U.S. Campaign for Palestinian Rights and Jewish Voice for Peace.

In September 2018, Marcus reopened a seven-year-old Title VI case against Rutgers University, previously closed by the Obama administration. The Zionist Organization of America welcomed the reopening of the case. In May 2020, nine civil rights groups filed a complaint against Marcus, charging that he had abused his authority and side-stepped department policy by reopening the case. Jonathan Tobin wrote such criticisms are "toxic partisanship," and that even Marcus's acknowledge his accomplishments and that he has done "as much, if not more, to fight anti-Semitism on college campuses as anyone in government has ever done." Ian Lustick, writing in The Forward, deplored both Marcus's appointment, and his use of his office, arguing that: "Marcus came to his position not to protect and expand learning opportunities in American educational institutions, but to threaten and narrow them, especially when it comes to open debate about Israel and the Palestinians. And his use of accusations of anti-Semitism in order to silence debate about Israel is being done with the sanction of the President of the United States."

Marcus resigned in July 2020 and returned to the Brandeis Center as chairman of the board.

Publications

Books
The Definition of Anti-Semitism, Oxford University Press, 2015
Jewish Identity and Civil Rights in America, Cambridge University Press, 2010

Articles
"The Second Mutation: Israel and Political Anti-Semitism", inFocus Spring 2008 • Vol. II: No. 1
"Anti-Zionism as Racism: Campus Anti-Semitism and the Civil Rights Act of 1964", William and Mary Bill of Rights Journal, Vol. 15, pp. 837–891, 2007
"The Resurgence of Anti-Semitism on American College Campuses", Current Psychology, Vol. 26, Nos. 3 & 4, 2007 
"The Most Important Right We Think We Have But Don't: Freedom from Religious Discrimination in Education". Nevada Law Journal, Vol. 7, p. 171, 2006
"Jurisprudence of the New Anti-Semitism", Wake Forest Law Review'', Vol. 44, 2009.

Testimonies 
Marcus has several times been used as an expert witness:
 Religious Harassment in Public Schools
 Fighting Anti-Semitism

In November 2012, Marcus testified before the U.S. Commission on Civil Rights as an expert on discrimination against Muslim and Arab Americans. His testimony highlights discrimination in public schools and penal institutions, as well as harmful stereotypes in popular culture.

Notes and references

References

Sources 

 
 

1966 births
Baruch College faculty
Living people
Trump administration personnel
UC Berkeley School of Law alumni
United States Department of Education officials
Williams College alumni